Kapitan Stupino is an ice hockey team in Stupino, Russia. Since 2011, the team plays in the Russian Junior Hockey League. They have previously played in the Vysshaya Liga, the second level of Russian ice hockey.

History
The club was founded as Troud Stupino in 1951. In 1999, they changed their name to Kapitan Stupino

External links
Official site

1951 establishments in Russia
Ice hockey clubs established in 1951
Ice hockey teams in Russia
Ice hockey in Moscow Oblast
Junior Hockey League (Russia) teams